The 25th New Brunswick Legislative Assembly represented New Brunswick between February 22, 1883, and April 2, 1886.

Robert Duncan Wilmot served as Lieutenant-Governor of New Brunswick until November 1885, when he was replaced by Samuel Leonard Tilley.

James E. Lynott was chosen as speaker.

In March 1883, the Conservatives led by Daniel L. Hanington lost a confidence motion and the Liberal Party led by Andrew G. Blair formed the new government.

History

Members 

Notes:

References 
The Canadian parliamentary companion, 1883, JA Gemmill

Terms of the New Brunswick Legislature
1883 establishments in New Brunswick
1886 disestablishments in New Brunswick
19th century in New Brunswick